Serromyia is a genus of biting midges in the subfamily Ceratopogoninae.

Species
S. atra (Meigen, 1818)
S. barber Wirth, 1952
S. crassifemorata Malloch, 1914
S. dipetala Remm, 1965
S. femorata (Meigen, 1804)
S. ledicola Kieffer, 1925
S. mangrovi Dalacolle & Braverman, 1987
S. morio (Fabricius, 1775)
S. rufitarsis (Meigen, 1818)
S. subinermis Kieffer, 1919

References

Ceratopogonidae
Chironomoidea genera
Taxa named by Johann Wilhelm Meigen